The Green Wave is a 2010 documentary film directed by Ali Samadi Ahadi. It covers the 2009 Iranian presidential election protests and human rights violations in Iran. The film premiered at the 2010 Filmfest Hamburg.

Synopsis  
The film portrays the actions of the Iranian government, under President Mahmoud Ahmadinejad, as it deals with backlash from citizens following the allegedly fraudulent results of the 2009 Iranian presidential elections. The film includes Facebook posts, Tweets and video in order to tell the story.

References

External links 
 Official Website
 
 Official Facebook Page

2010 films
German documentary films
Films directed by Ali Samadi Ahadi
2010s German films